The Politics of Chenzhou in Hunan province in the People's Republic of China is structured in a dual party-government system like all other governing institutions in mainland China.

The Mayor of Chenzhou is the highest-ranking official in the People's Government of Chenzhou or Chenzhou Municipal Government. However, in the city's dual party-government governing system, the Mayor has less power than the Communist Party of Chenzhou Municipal Committee Secretary, colloquially termed the "CPC Party Chief of Chenzhou" or "Communist Party Secretary of Chenzhou".

History
On August 14, 2009, Li Dalun was sentenced to life imprisonment for accepting bribes, holding a huge amount of property from an unidentified source and abusing his power by the Higher People's Court in Hunan.

List of mayors of Chenzhou

List of CPC Party secretaries of Chenzhou

References

Chenzhou
Chenzhou